A greeble, or "nurnies", is a part harvested from plastic modeling kits to be applied to an original model as a detail element. The practice of using parts in this manner is called "kitbashing".

Etymology
The term "greeblies" was first used by effects artists at Industrial Light & Magic in the 1970s to refer to small details added to models.
According to model designer and fabricator Adam Savage, George Lucas, Industrial Light & Magic's founder, coined the term "Greeble".
Ron Thornton is widely believed to have coined the term "nurnies" referring to CGI technical detail that his company Foundation Imaging produced for the Babylon 5 series, while the model-making team of 2001: A Space Odyssey referred to them as "wiggets".

Other uses

Greebles are also used to enhance interior sets. In Star Trek, corridor walls were decorated with objects such as pieces of pipe, which extended out from walls, usually with several fittings and a label implying it was an important part of the ship's infrastructure. In the movie Alien, the interior of the ship Nostromo was thoroughly greebled. Art director Roger Christian said, "Let's have a go at it. So we recruited some dressing prop people, got a hold of several tons of scrap, and went to work on the Nostromo's bridge... encrusting the set with pipes and wires and switches and tubing... then we painted it military green and began stenciling labels on everything."

See also
 Fractal
 Kitbashing
 Diapering
 Bump mapping
 Horror vacui

References

External links
 Staffan Norling's comments about greebling
 Starship Modeler: a resource for science fiction modeling
 buzzGreeble for modo
 Greeble plugin for 3D Studio Max
 Greeble plugin for Realsoft 3D
 Greeble plugin for trueSpace
 Greeble plugin for LightWave
Greeble script for Blender
 Greeble script for Autodesk Maya
 Greeble script for Cinema 4D

Computer graphic techniques
Film and video technology
Special effects
Vision
Scale modeling